Robert Roy Pool (born 1953) is an American screenwriter, best known for his authorship of the motion pictures Outbreak (1995), starring Dustin Hoffman, and The Big Town (1987), starring Matt Dillon. He also received a "story by" credit on the motion picture Armageddon (1998), which starred Bruce Willis and Billy Bob Thornton. Pool has collaborated with Laurence Dworet, a former emergency department doctor.

External links

1953 births
Living people
20th-century American screenwriters
American male screenwriters